Sherzod Azamatovich Mamutov (born 5 June 2002) is an Uzbekistani sabre fencer. He competed in the 2020 Summer Olympics.

References

2002 births
Living people
People from Nukus
Fencers at the 2020 Summer Olympics
Uzbekistani male sabre fencers
Olympic fencers of Uzbekistan
21st-century Uzbekistani people